WrestleMania Axxess is a professional wrestling fan convention held by WWE during the week of WrestleMania. The event typically runs for four days—from Thursday to WrestleMania Sunday—and features WWE talent and alumni autograph signings, interviews, fan activities, memorabilia displays, meet-and-greets, and matches.

History
The first event happened in 1988, when the World Wrestling Federation (WWF, now known as WWE) in association with The Trump Organization prepared a small festival to celebrate WrestleMania IV. It included autograph signings, a brunch, and a five kilometer run; the event was held again in 1989 for WrestleMania V. In 1992, a festival was held the day of WrestleMania VIII which included a WWF wrestler look-alike contest and a tournament for the WWF WrestleFest arcade game. In 1993, the WWF held a "WrestleMania Brunch" the day of WrestleMania IX at Caesars Palace, during the course of which Lex Luger attacked Bret Hart. In 1994, the WWF offered "Fan Fest" for the weekend of WrestleMania X, which allowed fans to step inside a WWF ring, participate in games, meet wrestlers, and purchase merchandise; the event was followed up in 1995 with another "Fan Fest" for WrestleMania XI. In 1999, the WWF held its first Saturday pre-WrestleMania event taking place on March 27, 1999. WrestleMania Rage Party, as it was known, was televised live on the USA Network from 10:00 p.m. to 11:00 p.m. (EST). The event was to be held at the Pennsylvania Convention Center. The idea of the event was "...to celebrate the final WrestleMania of the millennium..."

The following year, the WWF held its first WrestleMania Axxess event at the Anaheim Convention Center expanding upon the party idea of WrestleMania Rage Party. The event included autograph signings and mementos of inductees of the WWE Hall of Fame. There were also activities where fans could enter a wrestling ring and commentate a wrestling match. In 2001, WrestleMania Axxess was held at the Reliant Hall which expanded upon the event by adding numerous activities including areas where attendees could buy special merchandise, see a production truck, and check out special WWE vehicles. In 2002, WrestleMania Axxess was extended to a three-day event and was held at the Skydome (now Rogers Centre). The three-day event included similar activities to that of the one-day line-up. In 2007, WrestleMania Axxess went on tour around cities in both the United States and Canada. In recent years, Axxess has become a four-day event, with one session on Thursday, Friday, and Sunday, and three sessions on Saturday.

Since 2013, NXT matches have been held at WrestleMania Axxess, and since 2017, matches from various independent promotions have been held, such as Insane Championship Wrestling, Progress Wrestling, and Evolve. In 2018, WWE held four invitational tournaments for NXT championship matches. The winners of the WWE United Kingdom Championship Invitational, NXT North American Championship Invitational, NXT Tag Team Championship Invitational, and NXT Women's Championship Invitational tournaments received matches for the respective titles on April 8.

WWE has cancelled the traditional WrestleMania Axxess events since 2020 due to the onset of the COVID-19 pandemic and subsequently announced that the 2022 event during WrestleMania 38 weekend will be replaced by a Superstore Axxess shop with superstar panels and premium experiences. Unlike previous events, no live wrestling matches or autograph signings will be involved.

WrestleMania Superstore

Every year during the week leading up to WrestleMania, the WrestleMania Superstore is open at WrestleMania Axxess. The WrestleMania Superstore has "the largest selection of WrestleMania and WWE merchandise under one roof". It has over 700 items and includes exclusive Superstore-only merchandise. The store is open to the public, and no ticket is required.

Hall of Fame statue

Beginning in 2013, WWE has honored a Hall of Famer by unveiling a bronze statue at WrestleMania Axxess.

See also

List of professional wrestling conventions

References

Axxess
Recurring events established in 1999
Professional wrestling conventions